Nitric oxide synthase-interacting protein is an enzyme that in humans is encoded by the NOSIP gene.

References

Further reading